Paso Robles, officially El Paso de Robles (Spanish for "The Pass of Oaks"), is a city in San Luis Obispo County, California, United States.

Etymology and pronunciation 
The city's full name is "El Paso de Robles", which in Spanish means "The Pass of the Oaks".

People differ on the pronunciation of the city's shortened name of "Paso Robles". This anglicized version has been used in the city phone message.

History 

This area of the Central Coast, known as the City of El Paso De Robles, Paso Robles, or simply "Paso", is known for its thermal springs. Native Americans known as the Salinan lived in the area thousands of years before the mission era. They knew this area as the “Springs” or the “Hot Springs.” A tribal site on present-day Paso Robles was named elewexe, Obispeño for "Swordfish".

Paso Robles is located on the Rancho Paso de Robles Mexican land grant that was purchased by James and Daniel Blackburn in 1857. Their partner was Drury James of Kentucky, a veteran of the Mexican War and uncle of the outlaw Jesse James. The land was a rest-stop for travelers of the Camino Real trail, and was known for its mineral hot springs. Franciscan priests from neighboring Mission San Miguel constructed the first mineral baths in the area. During this period, Paso Robles began to attract the settlers who established cattle ranches, apple and almond orchards, dairy farms, and vineyards.

In 1864, the first El Paso de Robles Hotel was constructed and featured a hot mineral springs bath house. Three locations (Paso Robles Inn, River Oaks Hot Springs, and Franklin Hot Springs) have offered the mineral bath hot spring experience which brought people like Ignacy Jan Paderewski to Paso Robles.

James and Daniel Blackburn donated two blocks to the city for a public park to be used for the pleasure of its citizens and visitors. By original deed, the land was to revert to the donors if used for any other purpose than a public park. Two exceptions were made: allowing the building of the Carnegie Library, and the conversion of the library to a museum. The grounds were laid out by a Mr. Redington and a planting day was held when each citizen set out his own donation. Originally, the whole park was hedged in by a fence of cactus, and in 1890 a bandstand was built with money raised by private theatricals.

In 1886, after the coming of the Southern Pacific Railroad, work began on laying out a town site, with the resort as the nucleus. Two weeks after the first train arrived on October 31, 1886, a three-day celebration was held including a special train from San Francisco bringing prospective buyers, who toured the area and enjoyed the daily barbecues. On November 17, the “Grand Auction” was held, resulting in the sale of 228 lots.

The local agent for the SPR when it arrived in Paso Robles was R. M. "Dick" Shackelford, a Kentucky native who had come to California in 1853 to dig for gold. Shackelford had a varied career, going from gold mining to hauling freight by ox team, to lumbering, which took him to Nevada, where he served one term as a delegate in the state's first legislature for Washoe County. By 1886 Shackelford had returned to California and was living in Paso Robles, where he began buying up extensive property, building warehouses and starting lumber yards along the railroad's route. Shackelford also established the Southern Pacific Milling Company, which had a virtual monopoly on local milling until local farmers, in an effort to break Shackelford's stranglehold, themselves organized their own milling cooperative, the Farmers' Alliance Flour Mill.

In 1889, the same year that Paso Robles incorporated as a city, construction began on a magnificent new hotel. The hotel required over one million bricks and cost $160,000. The new El Paso de Robles Hotel opened for business in 1891. The new hotel was three stories tall and built of solid masonry, set off by sandstone arches. This ensured the hotel was completely fireproof. The hotel also featured a seven-acre (28,000 m2) garden and nine-hole golf course. Inside there was a library, a beauty salon, a barber shop, and various billiard and lounging rooms. The new hotel also offered an improved hot springs plunge bath as well as 32 individual bath rooms. The 20 by  plunge bath was considered one of the finest and most complete of its time in the United States.

On January 17, 1914, one of the world's most well-known concert pianists and composers came to the hotel: Ignace Paderewski. After three weeks of treatments at the hotel's mineral hot springs for his arthritis, he resumed his concert tour. He later returned to live at the hotel and bought two ranches west of Paso Robles.

During the next 30 years, the hotel was visited by other notables: Boxing champion Jack Dempsey, President Theodore Roosevelt, Adela Rogers St. Johns, Phoebe Apperson Hearst (the mother of William Randolph Hearst), actors Douglas Fairbanks, Boris Karloff, Bob Hope, and Clark Gable all stayed at the El Paso de Robles Hotel. And when Major League baseball teams used Paso Robles as a spring training home, the Pittsburgh Pirates and Chicago White Sox stayed at the hotel and soaked in the mineral hot springs to soothe tired muscles.

For a time, Paso Robles was known as the “Almond City” because the local almond growers created the largest concentration of almond orchards in the world. The ranchers in the outlying areas were very important to the Paso Robles area. On these ranches were cattle and horses, grain crops (primarily wheat and barley), garden produce and fruit and nut orchards. Many of these ranch lands and orchards have become vineyards for the many wineries which currently draw tourists to the area.

To show their appreciation to the ranchers, in October 1931 the business people established Pioneer Day, which is still an annual celebration.
Pioneer Day is celebrated on the second Saturday in October.

In December 1940, a fire completely destroyed the "fire-proof" El Paso de Robles Hotel. Guests staying the night escaped unharmed. However, the night clerk who discovered the fire suffered a fatal heart attack immediately after sounding the alarm. Within months after the blaze, plans for a new hotel to be built on the site were drawn up. The design was an entirely new concept: A garden inn-hotel, designed to accommodate motor vehicle travelers. By February 1942 construction was complete and the new Paso Robles Inn opened for business.

In 1955, scores of national media came to Paso Robles after pop culture icon and actor James Dean was pronounced dead in town following his tragic car accident just east of the city. Today, a roadside memorial in his honor stands in nearby Cholame, drawing fans looking to pay tribute to the fallen star every year.

Through the 1960s and 1970s, the City of Paso Robles experienced significant growth. The area's wine industry flourished, the California Mid-State Fair expanded into a regional attraction, and local lakes, such as Lake Nacimiento, became family vacation destinations.

The waters

As far back as 1795, Paso Robles has been spoken of and written about as “California’s oldest watering place”—the place to go for springs and mud baths. In 1864, a correspondent to the San Francisco Bulletin wrote that there was every prospect of the Paso Robles hot springs becoming the watering place of the state. By 1868 people were coming from as far away as Oregon, Nevada, Idaho, and even Alabama. Besides the well-known mud baths, there were the Iron Spring and the Sand Spring, which bubbles through the sand and was said to produce delightful sensations.

In 1882, Drury James and the Blackburn brothers issued a pamphlet advertising “El Paso de Robles Hot and Cold Sulphur Springs and the Only Natural Mud Baths in the World”. By then there were first-class accommodations: a reading room, barber shop, and telegraph office; a general store, a top-of-the-line livery stable, and comfortably furnished cottages for families that preferred privacy to quarters in the hotel. Visitors could stay in touch with the rest of the world, as there were two daily mails, a Western Union telegraph office, and a Wells Fargo agency with special rates for guests. As the springs became more and more a destination of the well-to-do as a place to go to socialize, the original purpose of the springs—to heal—became peripheral.

The bathhouse was erected over the sulphur spring in 1888, with a plunge and thirty-seven bath rooms. In the following year, work began on the large Hot Springs Hotel (today the Paso Robles Inn), which was completed in 1900 and burned down 40 years later. Since the privileges of using the baths were restricted to guests of the hotel and many sufferers of the ailments the baths cured could not pay the rates of the fashionable hotel, a few businessmen in Paso Robles made arrangements with Felix Liss for the right to bore for sulphur water on a lot which Liss owned. A sulphur well was reached, a bath house built and baths offered at an affordable rate of 25 cents. The establishment was later offered to the city and is currently the site of the Municipal Pool.

Wine
Paso Robles’ growth industry—wine—has a long history with the area. Wine grapes were introduced to the Paso Robles soil in 1797 by the Spanish conquistadors and Franciscan missionaries. Spanish explorer Francisco Cortez envisioned an abundant wine-producing operation and encouraged settlers from Mexico and other parts of California to cultivate the land. The first vineyardists in the area were the Padres of the Mission San Miguel, and their old fermentation vats and grapevine artwork can still be seen at the Mission, north of the city of Paso Robles.

Commercial winemaking was introduced to the Paso Robles region in 1882 when Andrew York, a settler from Indiana, began planting vineyards and established the Ascension Winery at what became York Mountain Winery and is now Epoch Winery. When York purchased the land, it was primarily apple orchards, with a small plot of wine grape vines. York found that the climate and soil were more suitable for vineyards and he expanded the vineyards. Within a few years, he found that the vines were yielding more than he could market, prompting him to build a small, stone winery.

Following Andrew York's early success in the wine business, Gerd and Ilsabe Klintworth planted a vineyard in the Geneseo/Linne area in approximately 1886. They were licensed to sell jugs of Zinfandel, Port, and Muscatel, as well as some of the area's first white wine made from Burger grapes. The Casteel Vineyards in the Willow Creek area were planted just prior to 1908. Casteel wines were stored and aged in a cave cellar. Cuttings from the old vines provided the start for other vineyards, still producing in the area today.

As the popularity of wines began to grow, so did the Paso Robles wine region. Lorenzo and Rena Nerelli purchased their vineyard at the foot of York Mountain in 1917. Their Templeton Winery was the area's first to be bonded following the repeal of Prohibition.

The early 1920s saw a flurry of winemaking activity when several families immigrated to the area to establish family vineyards and wineries. Sylvester and Caterina Dusi purchased a vineyard in 1924. The old head-pruned Zinfandel vines are now owned and cultivated by their son, Benito. The Martinelli, Busi, Vosti, Steinbeck and Bianchi Winery vineyards were also established around this time.

The Paso Robles wine region gained more notoriety when Ignace Paderewski, the famous Polish statesman and concert pianist, visited Paso Robles, became enchanted with the area, and purchased . In the early 1920s, he planted Petite Sirah and Zinfandel on his Rancho San Ignacio vineyard in the Adelaide area. Following Prohibition, Paderewski's wine was made at York Mountain Winery. The wines produced from grapes grown on Rancho San Ignacio went on to become award-winners. Paso Robles’ reputation as a premier wine region became firmly established as a result of this and later successes, and through to the late 1960s and early 1970s, a new generation of vineyard pioneers came forth and flourished in the Paso Robles area.

San Simeon earthquake  
  
The earthquake registered 6.6 on the moment magnitude scale and had a maximum Mercalli intensity of VIII (Severe). Two deaths occurred when the roof slid off the clock tower building, a popular landmark in downtown Paso Robles. The dormant underground springs that had once been used for the spa were brought back to life, causing flooding and a large sinkhole in the parking lot of the city hall and library. Due to lengthy environmental and engineering considerations, it took until December 2010 for the sinkhole to be filled and the parking lot resurfaced. Paso Robles has dedicated a new clock tower in memory of the two women who died.

Geography
Paso Robles is approximately halfway between the cities of Los Angeles and San Francisco.

The topography of the area consists of gentle rolling hills on the eastern half of the city, and foothill peaks which rise in elevation to the Santa Lucia Coastal Range on the west, which are all blanketed in the Californian chaparral environment, which is mainly dry grassland and oak woodland. Paso Robles sits on the eastern foothills of the Santa Lucia Coastal Mountain Range, which lies directly to the West of the city, and runs in a north–south direction, starting at Monterey, then runs down south to its terminus, in the San Luis Obispo area.

Climate
The Paso Robles area has a hot-summer Mediterranean climate (Csa) typical of coastal Southern California. The climate is defined by long, hot, dry summers and brief, cool, rainy winters. Paso Robles enjoys long-lasting, mild autumns and occasional early springs, giving the region a unique climate suitable for growing a variety of crops (ranging from primarily grapes, to olives, to almonds and other tree nuts). The city receives an average annual rainfall of about 14.71 inches (374 mm) per year, and most of this precipitation falls during winter and early spring. Paso Robles often receives less than 10 inches (250 mm) of rain per year and typically, no rain falls from May through September. Summers in Paso Robles tend to be very hot, with daily temperatures frequently exceeding  from late June to as late as mid September, and occasionally exceeding . Paso Robles' summers feature an unusually large daytime-nighttime temperature swing, where there may be a profound temperature difference, as much as 50 °F (28 °C), between the daytime highs and the overnight lows. This large diurnal swing permits the planting of certain grape varieties that would otherwise not be suited to the region. Winters are often very cool and moist, with daytime temperatures reaching into the low 50s°F (10 °C). Due to the somewhat close proximity to the Pacific Ocean, the marine layer occasionally makes it over the coast range and into Paso Robles, creating fog. Unlike typical California coastal marine fog in areas such as San Francisco, this fog is never long lasting, and typically burns off before 10am.  

It also reached the same temperature a few more times, most recently on September 6, 2020. There are an average of 81.0 days with high temperatures of 90 °F (32 °C) or higher and an average of 64.0 days with low temperatures of 32 °F (0 °C) or lower. Although snow is rare in Paso Robles, 4.0 inches fell on April 5, 1929, and on December 15, 1988.As well as February 24, 2023

At the Paso Robles Municipal Airport, the record high temperature was 115 °F on June 15, 1961, and July 20, 1960. There are an average of 86.7 days with highs of 90 °F (32 °C) or higher and an average of 53.6 days with lows of 32 °F (0 °C) or lower.

Demographics

2010
The 2010 United States Census reported that Paso Robles had a population of 29,793. The racial makeup of Paso Robles was 23,158 (77.7%) White, 622 (2.1%) African American, 297 (1.0%) Native American, 593 (2.0%) Asian, 56 (0.2%) Pacific Islander, 3,916 (13.1%) from other races, and 1,151 (3.9%) from two or more races. Hispanic or Latino of any race were 10,275 persons (34.5%).

The census reported that 29,624 people (99.4% of the population) lived in households, 164 (0.6%) lived in non-institutionalized group quarters, and 5 (0%) were institutionalized.

There were 10,833 households, out of which 4,104 (37.9%) had children under the age of 18 living in them, 5,721 (52.8%) were opposite-sex married couples living together, 1,345 (12.4%) had a female householder with no husband present, 603 (5.6%) had a male householder with no wife present. There were 767 (7.1%) unmarried opposite-sex partnerships, and 66 (0.6%) same-sex married couples or partnerships. 2,486 households (22.9%) were made up of individuals, and 1,192 (11.0%) had someone living alone who was 65 years of age or older. The average household size was 2.73. There were 7,669 families (70.8% of all households); the average family size was 3.19.

The population was spread out, with 7,829 people (26.3%) under the age of 18, 2,827 people (9.5%) aged 18 to 24, 7,870 people (26.4%) aged 25 to 44, 7,271 people (24.4%) aged 45 to 64, and 3,996 people (13.4%) who were 65 years of age or older. The median age was 35.3 years. For every 100 females, there were 94.9 males. For every 100 females age 18 and over, there were 92.4 males.

The homeowner vacancy rate was 1.9%; the rental vacancy rate was 3.8%.  16,666 people (55.9% of the population) lived in owner-occupied housing units and 12,958 people (43.5%) lived in rental housing units.

2000
As of the census of 2000, there were 24,297 people, 8,556 households, and 6,040 families residing in the city. The racial makeup of the city was 75.70% White, 3.32% Black or African American, 1.30% Native American, 1.89% Asian, 0.14% Pacific Islander, 13.68% from other races, and 3.97% from two or more races. Hispanic or Latino of any race were 27.72% of the population.
There were 8,556 households, out of which 37.4% had children under the age of 18 living with them, 53.4% were married couples living together, 12.5% had a female householder with no husband present, and 29.4% were non-families. 23.7% of all households were made up of individuals, and 11.4% had someone living alone who was 65 years of age or older. The average household size was 2.73 and the average family size was 3.23.
In the city, the population was spread out, with 29.8% under the age of 18, 10.5% from 18 to 24, 27.7% from 25 to 44, 18.6% from 45 to 64, and 13.4% who were 65 years of age or older. The median age was 33 years. For every 100 females, there were 102.8 males. For every 100 females age 18 and over, there were 97.6 males.
The median income for a household in the city was $39,217, and the median income for a family was $44,322. Males had a median income of $35,514 versus $24,058 for females. The per capita income for the city was $17,974. About 10.7% of families and 13.6% of the population were below the poverty line, including 17.7% of those under age 18 and 9.7% of those age 65 or over.

From 2000 to 2007, the city of Paso Robles experienced an average annual population growth rate of 3.18%. As calculated by the U.S. Census Bureau and the State Department of Finance, the city limits population of Paso Robles as of early 2007 was 29,934, with a Greater Area/"Metro" population of 41,249.

2007 ACS census update
As of the 2007 American Community Survey (ACS) update, the city limits population was estimated at 27,868 people, 7,880 families within the city, and an average citizen age of 33.2 years old. The city limits population density was 1,504.2 people per square mile (29.18 km2), there were 11,218 total available housing units with 10,876 of them occupied (total households). The racial makeup of the city was 82.0% White, 2.8% Black or African American, 1.1% Native American, 2.0% Asian, 0.08% Pacific Islander, 12.1% from other races, and 3.5% from two or more races. Hispanic or Latino of any race were 32.9% of the population.
There were 10,876 households, out of which 33.9% had children under the age of 18 living with them, 52.6% were married couples living together, 14.8% had a female householder with no husband present, and 27.5% were non-families. 20.7% of all households were made up of individuals, and 8.9% had someone living alone who was 65 years of age or older. The average household size was 2.56 and the average family size was 2.96.
In the city, the population was spread out, with 27.7% under the age of 18, 10.7% from 18 to 24, 25.7% from 25 to 44, 23.9% from 45 to 64, and 11.7% who were 65 years of age or older. The median age was 33.2 years.
The median income for a household in the city was $51,172, and the median income for a family was $57,114. Males had a median income of $42,357 versus $29,311 for females. The per capita income for the city was $23,544. About 11.4% of families and 13.5% of the population as a whole were below the poverty line, including 18.2% of those under age 18 and 12.2% of those age 65 or over.

Economy

Wine and vineyards

The Paso Robles Wine Country has a number of wineries and vineyards in the area. It is the location of the Paso Robles AVA (American Viticultural Area).  More than 25 different varieties of grapes are grown in the Paso Robles Wine Country and there are over 250 bonded wineries.

In 1993, Paso Robles grape growers, wineries and wine tasting rooms united to form the Paso Robles Wine Country Alliance. This non-profit trade organization is dedicated to the promotion and education of the Paso Robles premium wine country.

The Paso Robles Wine Country Alliance is a cooperative marketing alliance made up of Paso Robles Wine Country wineries, vineyards and related businesses. They host many of the festivals in the Paso Robles Area, and strengthen brand awareness locally, regionally and nationally. The wine alliance focuses on trade and consumer outreach, media relations, buyer tours, educational and research programs and giving back to education and health organizations in the Paso Robles community.

Sustainable building
Several companies in the area specialize in straw-bale construction, insulating concrete forms, rammed earth, super insulated buildings, and Leadership in Energy and Environmental Design (LEED) construction. Within a  radius of downtown Paso Robles there are twelve straw bale homes, six insulated concrete homes, and several straw bale wineries/tasting rooms.

Arts and culture
Every year in March, the Paso Robles Wine Country Alliance hosts the Zinfandel Festival, during which Central Coast Zinfandel producers and the public visit the area to enjoy the wine of the area. This event is held by the Paso Robles Wine Country Alliance, a non-profit cooperative marketing alliance looking to not only educate the community and surrounding communities about Paso Robles wine, but to also give back to the community.

The Paso Robles Wine Festival takes place in May and an olive festival takes place yearly also. In October is the Harvest Wine Weekend, celebrating the wine harvest in the region. The Paso Robles Wine Country Alliance also host a Grand Tasting Tour, which takes the wines of the Paso Robles area to other areas in California, and other states such as Washington, D.C.

On Memorial Day Weekend, Paso Robles hosts the Festival of the Arts in the downtown park.  With over 100 artists over three art-filled days, the festival of the arts is a multiday arts festival which is intended to honor and preserve the natural environment and character of the region through the arts.

In August of each year, the Paso Robles Main Street Association presents the Olive Festival in the downtown park featuring free olive oil and olive product sampling from producers from all over California.

Government

Local government 
Paso Robles is a general law city; it does not have a city charter. It uses a council-manager form of government, directed by a five-member city council. The council consists of a mayor (elected at-large for a four-year term during non-presidential even-numbered years) and four council members (elected at-large for staggered four-year terms in even-numbered years (2+2)). The mayor has no veto power, but has a vote on the council. Prior to the mid-1990s, the mayor was rotated through the city council members on a yearly basis. Then it became a two-year general election post. In 2012, the voters voted to make the mayor a four-year post. The council appoints the city manager and city attorney, but the city clerk and city treasurer are elected officials.

State and federal representation

Transportation

Highways
Paso Robles is at the major crossroads of U.S. Highway 101 and State Highway 46, about halfway between Los Angeles and the San Francisco Bay Area. Paso Robles is currently served by one freeway and two highways:
  U.S. Route 101 (US 101) is the most heavily traveled road-transportation arterial for the city of Paso Robles. US 101 runs in a north–south direction and bisects the city (along with the Salinas River), into its western and eastern portions. Traveling northward from the city, US 101 heads to San Jose and San Francisco, and continues on along the coast up through Northern California and Oregon, and ends near Olympia in Washington state. Traveling southward from the city, US 101 heads to San Luis Obispo, Santa Barbara, Ventura, and on to its southern terminus in Los Angeles.
  State Route 46 (SR 46) is the main east–west arterial and connects the city with the San Joaquin Valley. Traveling westward, SR 46 leaves the city and gradually climbs the Santa Lucia Coastal Range, where it then quickly descends and meets the Pacific Ocean, just south of the coastal village of Cambria at its westernmost terminus at State Route 1, also known as the Pacific Coast Highway. In the future, SR 46 may be considered for a possible westward extension of Interstate 40.
  State Route 229 is mainly an intra-county route that is used for traveling between the small rural towns in the eastern part of the county.

Rail transportation

Amtrak, the national passenger rail system, serves Paso Robles, operating its Coast Starlight daily in each direction between Seattle, Washington, and Los Angeles. Amtrak's Pacific Surfliner, which operates between San Diego and Paso Robles, connects by bus transfer from San Luis Obispo Railroad Station.

Airport
Paso Robles Municipal does not offer scheduled passenger service. Scheduled passenger market is available at the nearby San Luis Obispo County Regional Airport,  to the south in San Luis Obispo. The Paso Robles airport has daily business aviation operations, in addition to serving as a large general aviation base. The California Department of Forestry and Fire Protection (CAL FIRE) has an air attack base at the airport. There, aircraft are reloaded with fire fighting chemicals, which are dropped on brush and forest fires. The local Civil Air Patrol squadron also operates and trains on the airbase as part of the localized squadron 103, performing training craft operations known as O-Flights in a trainer craft that is brought to a desired altitude then dropped, essentially being towed by the aircraft, cadets of the Civil Air Patrol are the most of this demographic, but the cadets also help out congestion in the airport when it is busy during the operations. Also, the California Highway Patrol (CHP) houses a fixed-wing aircraft, used for speed enforcement, and a helicopter, used for search and rescue. The area immediately surrounding the Paso Robles Airport, known as Airport Road Industrial Park, is also home to many aviation maintenance providers and facilities, as well as home to many aviation parts manufacturers and other related businesses. LaGuardia's Italian Deli, operating since November 2012, is the only restaurant on the field, and is located in the terminal building.

The Paso Robles Airport hosts the Northern California Regional Aerobatic Contest which is held annually in mid-June.

Education
The Paso Robles Public Schools District contains six elementary schools, two middle schools, three high schools, and four other  school sites and programs.

Elementary and middle schools

Almond Acres Charter Academy (K–8)
Bauer–Speck Elementary (K–5)
Georgia Brown Elementary (Dual language immersion campus) (K–5)
Kermit King Elementary (K–5)
Pat Butler Elementary (K–5)
Virginia Peterson Elementary (K–5)
Winifred Pifer Elementary (K–5)
George Flamson Middle School (6–8)
Daniel Lewis Middle School (6–8)
Saint Rose of Lima School (Pres.–8)
Trinity Lutheran School (Pres.–8)

High schools
 Paso Robles High School
 Liberty High School
 Independence High School

Colleges and adult education
 Cuesta College
 Paso Robles Adult School
 PR Culinary Arts Academy
 University of Phoenix Satellite Office

Media

Local newspapers include Paso Robles Daily News and Paso Robles Press.

Radio stations serving the area include KPRL-AM/1230.

Sports and recreation
Paso Robles offers its residents and visitors cycling, golfing, tennis and swimming. In 2009 and 2011, Paso Robles was the finish line for Stage 5 of the AMGEN Tour of California. Since 2008, Paso Robles hosts the annual Wine Vine Run, a half marathon  and 5k foot race to benefit Paso Robles High School youth sports programs.

Although Lake Nacimiento is not actually located within the city of Paso Robles itself, it is however in what is considered the Greater Paso Robles Area. "The Lake", as it is known to locals, shares the 93446 zip code with Paso Robles, due to its proximity to the city. The lake provides ample room for waterskiing, wakeboarding, jetskiing, and other water-related activities, in addition to fishing and swimming.

Parks and recreation
Located just off of Highway 46 at Union Road is the  Barney Schwartz Park. The park has baseball, softball and soccer facilities, as well as lake access, picnicking, event pavilions, picnicking and playgrounds. Centennial Park is located in the eastern section of Paso Robles. Besides being the home of all indoor community sports (basketball, volleyball and gymnastics) and many different classes and activities, the  Centennial Park contains a 200,000-gallon swimming pool and wading pool with waterslides, group barbecue areas, grassy picnic and pavilion areas, an amphitheater, walking paths, two outdoor half-court basketball courts, five pickleball courts, four tennis courts, a  paved trail, four lighted tennis courts and two playgrounds.

The land upon which City Park sits was donated by the town's founders, James and Blackburn, for the specific use of a public park. Located in the heart of downtown, the  park provides easy access to the downtown area's amenities. Holiday and festival events are often held at this park, including holidays such as the 4th of July. City Park hosts “Concerts in the Park”, Trading Day, bi-weekly farmers markets, the Wine Festival, the Olive Festival, the Festival of the Arts, and several car shows.

Sherwood Park is located on the upper south-east side of town and is used mostly for youth sports. The Little League field was completely redone in April 2002. In addition to the renovated Little League Field, Sherwood Park has one basketball court, horseshoe pits, a sand volleyball court, barbecue areas, three soccer fields, a softball field, and tennis courts. The park also features a playground area with a medieval theme called Sherwood Forest.

Venues
 Paso Robles Event Center, home to the California Mid-State Fair
 Vina Robles Amphitheatre, a 3000-seat outdoor theatre, opened in 2013.
 River Oaks Hot Springs Spa, outdoor venue
 Paso Robles Inn Ballroom, indoor venue

Notable people
 Frank Armitage, muralist, painter, former Walt Disney imagineer
 Dylan Beavers, Team USA-Collegiate baseball player/33rd overall pick in 2022 MLB Draft (Baltimore Orioles)
 Travis Bertoni, PGA Tour/U.S. Open professional golfer
 Casey Biggs, actor, best known for his work on Star Trek: Deep Space Nine; has a home in Paso Robles and has done commercials for Paso Robles wine
 Jason Botts, born in 1980 in Paso Robles, was designated hitter and outfielder for Texas Rangers
 Christine Clayburg, correspondent for Fox News Channel
 Adam Firestone, co-founder of Firestone Walker Brewing Company
 Bailey Gaither, professional wide receiver for the Pittsburgh Maulers
Larry Grant, former American football linebacker, played for the San Francisco 49ers in the NFL. Former head football coach at Paso Robles High School.
 Dennis Harrah, former NFL offensive lineman, played 13 seasons for the Los Angeles Rams.
 Terry Hoage, former NFL player, currently operates Terry Hoage Vineyards in Paso Robles
 Derrick Jasper, assistant coach for Texas Tech Red Raiders men's basketball team; former men's basketball player for Kentucky Wildcats and UNLV Rebels
 Rusty Kuntz, baseball player for 1984 World Series champion Detroit Tigers and coach for 2015 World Series champion Kansas City Royals.
 Alex McWilliams, Professional Bullfighter. 
 Frank Minini, NFL player, born in Paso Robles
 Colleen Moore, actress, died in Paso Robles
 Josh Oliver, professional tight end for the Jacksonville Jaguars/Baltimore Ravens
 Ignacy Jan Paderewski, world-famous Polish pianist; was elected Polish Prime Minister and Minister of Foreign Affairs
 Don Parish (American football), 1948-2018; Pop Warner Trophy recipient/Stanford Hall of Fame inductee
 Hampton John "Hamp" Pool, football player, coach and scout who was part of two NFL championship teams
 Hal Rhyne, baseball player
 Hunter Tylo, actress, lives in Paso Robles
 Mitchell Van Dyk, NFL offensive tackle
 Elena Verdugo, born April 25, 1925, in Paso Robles, starred in films and on television series Marcus Welby, M.D. and has a star on Hollywood Walk of Fame
 King Vidor (1894–1992), pioneering film director
 David Walker, co-founder of Firestone Walker Brewing Company
 Jake Zemke, professional motorcycle racer

References

External links

 

 
1889 establishments in California
Cities in San Luis Obispo County, California
Incorporated cities and towns in California
Populated places established in 1889